Parks Township is a township in Armstrong County in the U.S. state of Pennsylvania. The population was 2,471 at the 2020 census, a decrease from 2,744 at the 2010 census.

Geography
Parks Township is located in southern Armstrong County; the Kiskiminetas River forms the township's southern boundary with Westmoreland County. Carnahan Run flows through Parks Township.

The township includes the unincorporated communities of North Vandergrift, Kepple Hill, Pleasant View, River View, and Kiskimere, all in the Kiskiminetas River valley. Farther inland is the community of Dime.

Demographics

As of the census of 2000, there were 2,754 people, 1,108 households, and 794 families residing in the township.  The population density was 195.4 people per square mile (75.5/km2).  There were 1,186 housing units at an average density of 84.2/sq mi (32.5/km2).  The racial makeup of the township was 95.21% White, 3.23% African American, 0.04% Native American, 0.91% from other races, and 0.62% from two or more races. Hispanic or Latino of any race were 0.62% of the population.

There were 1,108 households, out of which 29.0% had children under the age of 18 living with them, 58.9% were married couples living together, 8.5% had a female householder with no husband present, and 28.3% were non-families. 23.6% of all households were made up of individuals, and 11.3% had someone living alone who was 65 years of age or older.  The average household size was 2.47 and the average family size was 2.92.

The township median age of 41 years was slightly more than the county median age of 40 years. The distribution by age group was 22.4% under the age of 18, 6.0% from 18 to 24, 28.2% from 25 to 44, 25.0% from 45 to 64, and 18.4% who were 65 years of age or older.  The median age was 41 years. For every 100 females there were 97.6 males.  For every 100 females age 18 and over, there were 96.3 males.

The median income for a household in the township was $29,915, and the median income for a family was $37,827. Males had a median income of $33,250 versus $20,461 for females. The per capita income for the township was $13,818.  About 12.6% of families and 15.1% of the population were below the poverty line, including 19.9% of those under age 18 and 4.3% of those age 65 or over.

Environmental cleanup
The Shallow Land Disposal Area site (part of NUMEC) was under cleanup by the U.S. Army Corps of Engineers as of 2010.

History
Parks Township was originally merged with the neighboring townships of Bethel and Gilpin, known as Allegheny Township. In 1878, finding it was too large to manage and supervise, the three split and Parks Township was incorporated.

Cemeteries
Highfield Lutheran Church Cemetery
Keppel Burial Ground
Laurel Point Cemetery
Parks Family Cemetery
Porter Cemetery

References

Populated places established in 1814
Townships in Armstrong County, Pennsylvania